Jasenovac Zagorski is a village in the municipality of Krapinske Toplice, Krapina-Zagorje County in Croatia. According to the 2011 census, there are 72 inhabitants in the area.

References

Populated places in Krapina-Zagorje County